Acromyrmex crassispinus is a species of leaf-cutter ant, a New World ant of the subfamily Myrmicinae found in the wild naturally throughout South America, especially in Argentina and Paraguay.

Acromyrmex crassispinus is black-brown in colour; the queen is 10 – 12 mm in size and the workers may range from 5 to 15 mm long.

Other names 
 Acromyrmex atratus Gonçalves, 1961
 A. diabolica Gonçalves, 1961
 A. insularis Gonçalves, 1961
 A. mediocris Gonçalves, 1961
 A. mesonotalis Forel, 1909
 A. rufescens Gonçalves, 1961
 A. rusticus Gonçalves, 1961

See also
List of leafcutter ants

References

Acromyrmex
Insects described in 1909
Hymenoptera of South America